Jack Richard Salamanca (born December 20, 1922 in  St. Petersburg, Florida - October 30, 2013 in Potomac, Maryland)  was an American writer and professor emeritus at the University of Maryland. His first novel, The Lost Country (1958), was made into Wild in the Country, a 1961 film starring Elvis Presley; his second, Lilith, was filmed as Lilith in 1964, starring Warren Beatty.

Books
 The Lost Country (1958) 
 Lilith (1961) 
 A Sea Change (1969) 
 Embarkation (1973) 
 Southern Light (1986)
 That Summer's Trance (2000)

References

External links
 

1922 births
2013 deaths
Writers from St. Petersburg, Florida
20th-century American writers
21st-century American writers
United States Army Air Forces personnel of World War II
American expatriates in the United Kingdom